Ma Yanhong (born March 21, 1964 in Beijing, China) (also reported in some media as July 5, 1963) is a retired Chinese Olympic athlete. She was the first Chinese gymnast, male or female, to win a gold medal at the World Gymnastics Championships and the Olympic Games.

Biography
Ma began gymnastics at the Shichahai Sports School for Amateurs in her hometown of Beijing. The age at which she started training has been variously reported as six, eight and nine.

In 1978, her first year with the Chinese national team, Ma made her international debut at the Asian Games, where she shared in the team gold medal and won the uneven bars title. She repeated her success at the 1978 Shanghai Cup, again winning team and bars titles. Ma was a member of the 1979, 1981 and 1983 World Championships teams; she was the Chinese National Champion in 1982. At the 1984 Los Angeles Olympics uneven bars final, Ma was suffered from Appendicitis, though in great pain she insisted on finishing the competition. Finally Ma tied with American Julianne McNamara to win the gold medal on bars in that competition  and both of them scored a perfect 10.0 in the final.  This is the first Olympic gold medal ever for China in women's gymnastics.

Ma's best event was unquestionably the uneven bars; she placed first on this apparatus at the age of fifteen at the 1979 World Championships. Her bars routines were noted for their technical difficulty, virtuosity and originality. The dismount she pioneered, a hecht-front salto-full now known as the Ma, is valued as an "F," the second highest difficulty rating possible, in the current Code of Points. Ma was not only a bars specialist, however: she placed fourth in the all-around at the 1981 World Championships, sixth all-around at the 1984 Olympics, and often won silver or bronze medals on the floor exercise and balance beam in international meets.

After retiring from gymnastics, Ma pursued a University education and spent some time in the UK and the United States, coaching at clubs in California. She returned to China in 1994 and is now involved in business. She also owns a Japanese restaurant in Beijing and has worked as a commentator for various gymnastics competitions, including the 1999 World Championships in Tianjin. She is inducted into the International Gymnastics Hall of Fame in 2008, and became the first Chinese women inductee of the International Gymnastics Hall of Fame.

Eponymous skill 
Ma has one eponymous skill listed in the Code of Points.

Competitive history

References

External links
 
 Ma Yanhong at Gymn Forum
 
 

1964 births
Living people
Chinese female artistic gymnasts
Gymnasts at the 1984 Summer Olympics
Hui sportspeople
Medalists at the World Artistic Gymnastics Championships
Olympic gold medalists for China
Olympic bronze medalists for China
Originators of elements in artistic gymnastics
Gymnasts from Beijing
World champion gymnasts
Olympic medalists in gymnastics
Asian Games medalists in gymnastics
Gymnasts at the 1978 Asian Games
Olympic gymnasts of China
Medalists at the 1984 Summer Olympics
Asian Games gold medalists for China
Medalists at the 1978 Asian Games